The Hallgarter Zange is a hill in the Taunus mountains of Hesse, Germany.

Hills of Hesse
Rheingau-Taunus-Kreis
Mountains and hills of the Taunus
High Taunus
Rheingau